This is a list of rivers in Belarus.
All rivers measured in Kilometres. Inside of Belarus and the length in total.

Longest rivers

List of Rivers in Belarus

Dnieper River
Drut River (R)
Sozh River (L)
Iput River
Pronya
Besed
Berezina River (R)
Svislach
Niamiha River
Babrujka River
Pripyat River (R)
Braginka
Horyn River
Styr River
Ubarts
Ptsich
Sluch
Yaselda River
Stviha
Neman River
Western Berezina
Disna
Drisa
Usa River
Shchara
Kotra River
Vilija
Vilnia River
Narač River
Merkys River
Ūla River
Western Dvina
Pałata
Kasplya River
Dysna
Bug River
Mukhavets River
Dachlovka
Zhabinka
Trascianica
Asipaǔka
Ryta
Lesnaya
Pulva

Minor
Drahabuž River
Lovat River
Narew

References 

Belarus
Rivers